This is a list of singers from the Netherlands.

List

0-9

A

B

C

D

E

F

G

H

I

J

K

L

M

N

O

P

R

S

T

V

W

X

Y

Z

 
Dutch
Singers